In Spain, telera is a typical bread from the area of Córdoba (in Andalusia). Includes ~W130 wheat flour, sourdough, water, salt and yeast. Its peculiar shape, which resembles a montera (the traditional hat of a torero), is the result of the deep marks (greña) that are made, generally two, and diagonally along the piece. Being a candeal bread, it is quite durable, but when it gets hard, it is typically used to make salmorejo from Córdoba.

Features 
The telera cordobesa belongs to a family of Spanish breads called panes candeales ('candeal breads', also known as pan bregado or pan sobado), which have a long tradition in Andalusia, Extremadura and the two Castiles. These breads are made from durum wheat (Triticum turgidum var. durum L.).

Origin 
Traditionally it is said that the name of telera is a contraction of tres hileras ("three rows"), since it consists of two diagonal ridges that separate the bark into three parts. But the author A. Ortega Morán proposes an analogy with the counter of a plough (called "telera" in Spanish). The counter is a long iron crossbar that kept the plough straight (see parts of the Roman plow), and that was formerly used in a figurative sense as a synonym for something long. According to the Royal Spanish Academy, it comes from Latin *telaria, in turn from telum, 'sword'. According to the author and baker , «telera» in Spain refers to a variety of breads «whose common characteristic is to be lengthened».

Culinary uses 
The traditional Andalusian breakfast is made with slices of this bread, young olive oil and sugar. Once staled, the telera is ideal for use as an ingredient in salmorejo from Córdoba, a cold tomato cream, bread, and other crushed ingredients.

See also 

 Bread culture in Spain
 Sevillian bollo, another Andalusian bread
 Telera, derived Mexican bread

References 

Spanish breads
Andalusian cuisine
Córdoba, Spain